</noinclude>
The Newfoundland is a  residential skyscraper, located between Westferry Road and Bank Street on the Isle of Dogs, London.

South Quay Properties, Ltd., a subsidiary of Canary Wharf Group, submitted a planning application to Tower Hamlets in June 2013 for the erection of a 58-storey and linked 2-storey building for residential use, along with some retail uses and car parking at a location bounded by Park Place, Westferry Road and Heron Quay Road.

Newfoundland was designed by architects Horden Cherry Lee and structural engineers WSP Global. The building was opened for rent in May 2021.

Gallery

References

External links
 

Canary Wharf buildings
Buildings and structures in the London Borough of Tower Hamlets
Residential skyscrapers in London
Proposed skyscrapers in London